Émile Idée (born 19 July 1920) is a French former professional road bicycle racer. Idée is a five-time winner of the Critérium National (a race that saw its name changed to Critérium International in 1979), a record he shares with Raymond Poulidor and Jens Voigt. He finished in second place in the 1948 Paris–Roubaix.

Major results

1940
 1st Critérium National de la Route
1942
 1st  Road race, National Road Championships
 1st Critérium National de la Route
 1st 
 1st Grand Prix des Nations (occupied zone)
 1st GP de Provence
1943
 1st Critérium National de la Route
 5th Grand Prix des Nations
1944
 1st 
 3rd Road race, National Road Championships
 3rd Grand Prix des Nations
1945
 3rd Paris–Tours
 3rd Critérium National de la Route
1946
 2nd Grand Prix des Nations
1947
 1st  Road race, National Road Championships
 1st Critérium National de la Route
 1st Ronde d'Aix-en-Provence
 2nd Paris–Tours
 2nd Critérium des As
 2nd Grand Prix des Nations
1948
 1st Trophée du Journal d'Alger
 2nd Paris–Roubaix
 2nd Critérium National de la Route
 3rd Paris–Tours
1949
 1st Critérium National de la Route
 1st Stage 13 Tour de France
 8th GP de Suisse
1950
 1st Cote de Gourdon
 3rd Road race, National Road Championships
 4th Grand Prix des Nations
 5th Paris–Tours
 6th GP Lugano
 8th Road race, UCI Road World Championships
 9th Paris–Brussels
1951
 1st Stage 4a Paris–Nice

References

External links 

Emile Idée's page at Cycling Ranking
Official Tour de France results for Emile Idée

French male cyclists
1920 births
Living people
French Tour de France stage winners
Sportspeople from Aisne
French centenarians
Men centenarians
Cyclists from Hauts-de-France